Brendan Kennedy (born ) is an American businessman, CEO and a co-founder of Privateer Holdings, along with Michael Blue and Christian Groh, and the former CEO of Tilray.

Early life
Kennedy is the sixth of seven children of a San Francisco family.

Kennedy earned a BA in architecture from the University of California, Berkeley in 1993, an MS in Engineering from the University of Washington in 1995, and an MBA from Yale University in 2005.

Career
Kennedy previously worked at SVB Analytics, an affiliate of Silicon Valley Bank, as did Christian Groh.

Kennedy is the former CEO of Tilray. In 2019, his total compensation from Tilray was $3.48 million, down from $31.82 million in 2018.

According to Bloomberg L.P., as of September 2018, Kennedy has a net worth of at least US$2.4 billion. Tilray stock later collapsed and as of February 2021, Kennedy is worth $238 million.

Personal life
Kennedy has two children, and lives in Seattle. He has said that "probably the hardest thing" about becoming rich was telling his in-laws. He experimented with cannabis before founding Privateer Holdings.

References

Living people
American billionaires
1970s births
Yale School of Management alumni
American company founders
American chief executives of financial services companies
University of California, Berkeley alumni
University of Washington College of Engineering alumni